Durvillaea incurvata is a large, robust species of southern bull kelp endemic to Chile.

Description
Durvillaea incurvata has unbranched stipes, and many holes occur on the primary and secondary blades.

Distribution
Durvillaea fenestrata is endemic to Chile from the coasts of Coquimbo to Betecoi Island in Guaitecas Archipelago.

Human use
Along with D. antarctica, D. incurvata is used in Chilean cuisine.

References

External links

Fucales
Flora of Chile
Edible seaweeds
Protists described in 2019
Ochrophyte species